Craig Menkins (born 6 July 1970) is an Australian former professional rugby league footballer who played in the 1990s.

Playing career
Originally from Maitland, New South Wales, Menkins made his first grade debut for the Western Suburbs Magpies in Round 13 of the 1993 NSWRL season. He would play five games in his lone season at the club.

He then played for Mackay in the Foley Shield before joining the North Queensland Cowboys in 1995, playing four games in the club's inaugural season. In Round 8 of the 1995 season, he came off the bench in the club's first win against the Western Suburbs Magpies.

In 1997, he played for Paris Saint-Germain in the Super League II season.

Post-playing career
Following his retirement, Menkins coached the Mornabah Miners and Wests Tigers Mackay.

References

1970 births
Living people
Australian rugby league players
North Queensland Cowboys players
Paris Saint-Germain Rugby League players
Rugby league hookers
Rugby league players from Maitland, New South Wales
Rugby league props
Western Suburbs Magpies players